Charles Purle, was a High Court Judge.

Early life and education

Legal career

Purle's career started in 1970 when he was called to the bar. Subsequently, he was appointed Queen's Counsel in 1989. He was appointed as a Specialist Chancery Circuit Judge with effect from 21 June 2007, and was based in Midland Circuit, Birmingham Civil Justice Centre. He retired on 10 February 2018, after having extended his retirement which was originally due in 2017.

References

20th-century births
2018 deaths
21st-century English judges
Lawyers from Birmingham, West Midlands